S. A. Ashokan, born as Antony and often spelled Asokan, was an Indian actor who worked mainly in Tamil cinema and theatre. He was popular mainly for playing negative roles but was also a successful character actor.

Early life 
Ashokan was born on 20 May 1931 as Anthony in Tiruchirapalli. He showed interest in stage plays and frequently took part in oratorical and writing competitions during his childhood. He finished his B.A. degree at the St. Joseph's College, Tiruchirapalli.

Career 
After completing his degree, Anthony met director T. R. Ramanna, who introduced him to the film industry. Anthony changed his name to Ashokan upon Ramanna's request and maintained the same name for life. Ashokan made his acting debut in a minor role in the film Avvaiyar. He was given a positive role in the film Penn Kulathin Ponvilakku (1959) as an admirer of a woman he considers a sister. He gained the attention of the general public with the film Kappalottiya Thamizhan in 1961, where he portrayed the role of Collector Ash. Later films which featured him in the lead were, however, moderately successful. Active mostly in the 1960s and 1970s, he acted mainly in villainous roles and did character roles opposite many leading actors of those times.

Ashokan's performance as a helpless traveller who gets conned in Vallavanukku Vallavan, and as the historical Indian character Duryodhana in the mythology film Karnan were well received. He was regularly cast in supporting roles as an elder brother, father or father-in-law, or the main villain in 59 films with M. G. Ramachandran in the lead role, right from Baghdad Thirudan in 1960 to Ninaithadhai Mudippavan in 1975. Some of the popular films with MGR – S. A. Ashokan combination are Arasilangkumari, Thaai Sollai Thattadhe, Thayai Katha Thanayan, Kudumba Thalaivan, Panathottam, Koduthu Vaithaval, Dharmam Thalai Kaakkum, Periya Idathu Penn, Anandha Jodhi, Panakkara Kudumbam, Needhikkuppin Paasam, Kaanchi Thalaivan, Vettaikaaran (1964 film), Dheiva Thaai, Thozhilali, Panam Padaithavan, Kanni Thaai, Thazhampoo, Anbe Vaa, Mugaraasi, Chandhrodhayam, Thaali Bhagyam, Thanipiravi, Parakkum Paavai, Petralthan Pillaiya, Thaikku Thalaimagan, Arasa Kattalai, Kaavalkaaran (1967 film), Vivasayee, Ragasiya Police 115, Thaer Thiruvizha, Kannan En Kadhalan, Oli Vilakku, Kanavan, Kadhal Vaaganam, Adimaippenn, Nam Naadu (1969 film), Maattukara Velan, En Annan, Thalaivan (1970 film), Thedi Vandha Mappillai, Engal Thangam, Kumari Kottam, Rickshawkaran, Neerum Neruppum, Oru Thaai Makkal, Sange Muzhangu, Nalla Neram, Raman Thediya Seethai (1972 film), Ulagam Sutrum Valiban, Pattikaattu Ponnaiya, Netru Indru Naalai and Ninaithadhai Mudippavan. His performance as Professor Bhairavan in the M. G. Ramachandran-starrer Ulagam Sutrum Valiban was considered a "landmark performance". Some of his other well-known performances include the role of Soorapadman in Kandan Karunai (1967), an intriguing character role in the AVM Studios hit Veera Thirumagan, and important roles in Attukara Allamelu, Adimai Penn, Anbe Vaa, Kaanji Thalaivan, Vivasayee and Raman Thediya Seethai.

Other work 
Ashokan also worked as a singer in the film Iravum Pagalum for the song "Iranthavanai Somanthavanum." The film also marked actor Jaishankar's debut. He introduced filmmaker A. C. Trilokchander to AVM Studios, which helped the filmmaker make his mark. Ashokan, along with Jaishankar, and a troupe of popular artists, often toured all over Tamil Nadu to conduct cultural programs.

Personal life 
Ashokan was married to Mary Gnanam (originally named Saraswathi). They had two sons, including Vincent Asokan, who also became an actor.

Filmography 
This is a partial filmography. You can expand it.

References

External links 
 

1982 deaths
Indian male film actors
Indian male voice actors
20th-century Indian male actors
Tamil male actors
Male actors in Tamil cinema
Male actors from Tiruchirappalli
St Joseph's College, Tiruchirappalli alumni
1931 births